The 1992 State of Origin series saw the 11th time that the annual three-game series between the New South Wales and Queensland representative rugby league football teams was contested entirely under "state of origin" selection rules. It was the first year of involvement by New South Wales' most successful coach Phil Gould, who made only four player changes to the Blues squad during the series - one of these necessitated by the return from injury of champion play-maker Ricky Stuart. For the first time in thirteen years of Origin there was no involvement by Wally Lewis to inspire Queensland.


Games

Game I

Game I was a battle of attrition with a high casualty rate. Blues hooker Benny Elias spent time in the blood bin after copping a head gash which needed 10 stitches to close, Queensland second-rower Gary Larson left the field on a stretcher and Maroons prop Steve Jackson suffered severe concussion early in the match.

The Blues scored first from a planned move designed by Gould to enable Blues lock Bradley Clyde to encounter Mal Meninga one-on-one. Gould was convinced that Meninga's reduced lateral movement across field in defence was a weakness in the Queensland side.  He devised a move that would isolate Meninga and which led to Clyde easily standing up his Canberra teammate to score in the corner.

New South Wales' front-rowers Glenn Lazarus and Paul Harragon slowly began to take control of the rucks and after winger Rod Wishart kicked a penalty goal midway through the second half, replacement forward Craig Salvatori scored a crucial Blues try. In a match with so few scoring opportunities, the Blues' eight-point lead was sufficient to enable them to close out the match.

Clyde went off injured after scoring the first try and Laurie Daley knocked himself out in the in-goal just after half-time. Ben Elias returned in the second-half his face smeared with blood and a red-stained bandage around his head to take over as captain due to Daley's departure and to protect the Blues' lead. This led to one of Origin's enduring images when photographers and broadcast cameramen captured shots after the final siren of Elias' mother Barbara on the field and working around interviewers, mopping up the still flowing blood from her son's forehead as he spoke post-match.

Game II

In game II, early in the match prop Martin Bella and five-eighth Peter Jackson were sent to the sin-bin for back-chatting referee Bill Harrigan and the Maroons were reduced to 11 men for ten minutes. A minute after Queensland were restored to their full complement, lock Billy Moore on debut, slipped through to score an unconverted try.

Two penalty goals to Rod Wishart levelled the scores before half time and as the minutes ticked by after the break it appeared the match was headed for the first draw in 35 Origin contests. It was wet and greasy in the second half and scoring chances were minimal with both sides maintaining impregnable defences. Ricky Stuart missed with two late attempts at field goal and then with just 66 seconds remaining, a complete lack of urgency from the Blues defensive line saw Queensland halfback Allan Langer land a wobbly field goal (the first of his career) from close range to steal a 5-4 victory for the home side.

Game III

In the Game III decider of 1992 New South Wales led 4-2 at half-time when 21-year-old Balmain Tigers centre Tim Brasher replaced injured Blues winger Rod Wishart. Brasher immediately injected his team with a shot of enthusiasm with a series of lightning bursts from dummy-half that helped build their momentum.

The first try was scored by Ricky Stuart who went over from a rehearsed move in the 14th minute.
Blues fullback Andrew Ettingshausen next scored the try of the series midway through the second half following a Laurie Daley grubber-kick. It came after Elias went to the blind side from the play-the-ball, and passed to Daley who kicked. Centre Paul McGregor got to the ball first, stepped past a tackler and found Daley backing up, who gave the ball to Ettingshausen who scored for 8-4. Finally second-rower John Cartwright barged across the line from close range to open up a 16-4 lead.

Queensland's efforts to strike back in the final 10 minutes were thwarted by two desperate tackles from Brasher, the first on a runaway Mark Coyne and the second a stunning ball-and-all effort on Mal Meninga, who threatened to score in the dying minutes.

Teams

New South Wales

Queensland

See also
 1992 NSWRL season

References

Sources
 Big League's 25 Years of Origin Collectors' Edition, News Magazines, Surry Hills, Sydney
 Chesterton, Ray (1996) Good as Gould, Ironbark, Sydney

State of Origin series
State of Origin series